Pier Bandstand Weymouth is an Art Deco bandstand on the shore of Weymouth Bay in Dorset, England.

History

The Pier Bandstand was built in 1938-39 for a cost of £35,000, to the designs of V.J. Wenning, who had won the architectural competition for the bandstand's design. Wenning's plans were one of twenty-six entries considered. The builder, Christiani Neilson, employed local labour on the construction work, which began in January 1938. The bandstand was officially opened on 25 May 1939 by J.T. Goddard, the Mayor of Weymouth. Overall,  of concrete,  of steel,  of electrical conduit,  of neon tubing and 1,200 light bulbs were used during the course of construction.

The Pier Bandstand was designed with the bandstand extending out seaward from a two-storey building adjoining the promenade. The seaward section was able to seat 2,400 people, however only 800 of these seats were sheltered as the centre of the bandstand was roofless. Though the Pier Bandstand had gained some criticism for its intruding visual impact along the bay, it quickly became a popular attraction and was used to host many events from dances, concerts, wrestling, roller skating to the Miss Weymouth Bathing Beauty Contests. During the 1960s, the bandstand's promenade building was redesigned. It went on to house an amusement arcade and restaurant.

By the 1980s, the seaward end of the bandstand was in need of major repair to maintain the stability of the structure. With Weymouth & Portland Borough Council facing £300,000 in repair costs, the cheaper alternative of demolishing the bandstand was approved for a cost of £30,000. A national competition was launched to find the individual who would 'press the button' to demolish it, which was won by two schoolgirls from Birmingham. The bandstand was demolished on 4 May 1986, which drew a large crowd of spectators. As a result the structure is deemed to be a "lost" pier by some noted authorities The work left only the landward building standing, which was later refurbished. The Sea Palace Chinese Restaurant was officially opened in the building in July 2002. Today, the Pier Bandstand houses the Italian restaurant Al Molo, along with an amusement arcade and gift shop within its ground level kiosks.

Redevelopment plans
As part of the regeneration of Weymouth and Portland, it was decided in 2007 that Weymouth's Esplanade would be redeveloped in time for the 2012 Olympic Games. The scheme included plans for the restoration and extension of the bandstand, while the exterior Art Deco features and symmetry would be restored. In addition, the area in front of the bandstand was to be redesigned into a 1930s-styled square, acting as the northern gateway to Weymouth Esplanade. However, the plans collapsed after the South West Regional Development Agency withdrew its £6.6 million funding in 2009.

See also
 The Esplanade (Weymouth)
 Weymouth Pier

References

1939 establishments in England
Buildings and structures in Weymouth, Dorset
Tourist attractions in Weymouth, Dorset
Bandstands in England
Art Deco architecture in England
Music venues in Dorset